Ceres Storm is a 2000 science fiction novel by American author David Herter.

Plot summary
In the distant future on a terraformed Mars, Daric discovers that he is a clone of a former Emperor of Earth named Darius.  Daric is kidnapped by Kay-Tee agents in an attempt to bring him to earth to open Darius' complex that was sealed long ago. He escapes and begins a journey that takes him to an asteroid, Triton and Pluto's moon Charon.

Notes

2000 novels
2000 science fiction novels
Novels set on Mars